OnMobile is an Indian telecommunications company, headquartered in Bangalore. It offers products such as Videos, Tones, Games & Contests. Based on current deployments, OnMobile has over 100 million active subscribers and an addressable base of more than 1.68 billion mobile users across several geographies.

History
Founded in 2000, OnMobile is headquartered in Bangalore, India and serves 99 customers across the globe. OnMobile also has offices in Mumbai, Delhi, Bangladesh, Spain, Dubai, Nairobi, Sweden, and South Africa.

Originally incorporated in California under the name Onscan Technologies India Private Limited as a spin-off from Infosys, the company relocated to India.  The company changed its name to OnMobile Asia Pacific Private Limited in April 2001 and finally to its current name in August 2007.  OnMobile became the first Indian telecom VAS company to go public when it was listed on the Bombay Stock Exchange and the National Stock Exchange of India on 19 February 2008.

On 23 February 2017, François-Charles Sirois was appointed as the new chairman and chief executive officer. He resigned as CEO on 2 August 2020 while continuing to hold his position as Executive Chairman, and Krish Seshadri was appointed as the new chief executive officer on 3 August 2020.

Acquisitions 
As of 2020, OnMobile acquired six companies in order to expand their product line.

ITFinity 

In December 2006, OnMobile announced that it was acquiring ITFinity, a mobile software company, for $10–20 million.

Telisma
OnMobile paid €12 Million for acquiring French speech recognition company Telisma S.A.  Telisma has a speech recognition technology available in 10 Indian languages - Hindi, Bengali, Tamil, Gujarati, Punjabi, Kannada, Telugu, Malayalam, Marathi, and English.  Previously, OnMobile had used speech recognition from Nuance Communications that supported 15 different languages.

Dilithium Networks
In October 2010, OnMobile purchased Dilithium Networks, a developer of 3G video technology, for an undisclosed amount.

Livewire Mobile 
In June 2013, OnMobile acquired Livewire Mobile, a ringtone, ringback tone, an infotainment company, for $17.8 million.

Appland AB 
In October 2018, OnMobile Global Limited acquired Appland AB, one of the world's games and kids App Clubs subscription services.

rob0 Inc. 
In August, 2021, OnMobile Global Acquires 100% Stake in AI Powered Visual Retention Leader rob0.

References

Telecommunications companies of India
Companies based in Bangalore
Telecommunications companies established in 2000
Indian brands
2000 establishments in California
Companies listed on the National Stock Exchange of India
Companies listed on the Bombay Stock Exchange